Neapolitans are individually wrapped square/rectangular pieces of chocolate in assorted flavours. They have been produced in several different flavours and by numerous confectionery companies. They are often served by hotels and coffee shops (often with a cup of coffee) and when used for promotional purposes may feature packaging with personalised branding.

Terry’s Neapolitans

Terry's of York, England, first produced Neapolitans in 1899. The company was sold to Kraft Foods in 1993 and Terry's Neapolitans were discontinued in 2005 when their York factory was closed.
The flavours were:
Milk Chocolate (Blue)
Plain Chocolate (Red)
Mocha (coffee flavoured plain chocolate) (Brown)
Cafe Au Lait (coffee flavoured milk chocolate) (Turquoise)
Orange Milk Chocolate (Orange)
Orange Plain Chocolate (Pink)
Terry's also produced a selection of mint-flavoured neapolitans and cream-filled neapolitans. They would occasionally be sold in alternative packaging such as jars.
 
Similar boxed mixed assortments currently in production include 
Marks and Spencer's Neapolitans and Lindt Napolitains.

See also
 List of confectionery brands

References

Brand name confectionery
Yorkshire cuisine